New Ross may refer to:

New Ross, County Wexford, a town in Ireland
New Ross (Parliament of Ireland constituency)
New Ross (UK Parliament constituency)
New Ross Golf Club
New Ross RFC, rugby union club
New Ross, Nova Scotia, Canada
New Ross, Indiana, United States

See also
New Ross 20, Nova Scotia, Canada